Carangiformes is an order of the ray-finned fishes. The order is part of a clade which is a sister clade to the Ovalentaria, the other orders in the clade being Synbranchiformes, Anabantiformes, Istiophoriformes and Pleuronectiformes. The Carangiformes has been regarded as a monotypic order, with only the Carangidae within it, by some authorities and the families within the order have been classified as part of the wider order Perciformes. The 5th edition of Fishes of the World classify six families within the order Carangiformes, with other authorities expanding the order to include up to 30 families.

Families
The following families are classified within the order Carangiformes:

 Nematistiidae Gill (roosterfish) 
 Coryphaenidae Rafinesque, 1815 (dolphinfish) 
 Rachycentridae Gill 1896 (cobia)
 Echeneidae Rafinesque, 1815 (remoras)
 Carangidae Rafinesque, 1815 (jacks)
 Menidae Fitzinger, 1873 (moonfishes)

Coryphaenidae, Rachycentridae, and Echeneidae have been suggested to comprise a monophyletic grouping which has been recovered as a sister clade to the Carangidae.

See also
Giant trevally
Japanese amberjack
Mahi-mahi
Pompano

References

 
Ray-finned fish orders